Rupchand Hansda is an Indian writer of Santali language and civil servant  from West Bengal. He won Sahitya Akademi Award for Santali Translation in 2018. In 2020, he received the Sahitya Akademi Award for his collection of poems Gur Dak Kasa Dak.

Biography
Hansda was a student of Kapgari College. He works in Indian Railways. He was the founding president of All India Santali Writers Association and served this post for 27 years.

Hansda translated Shakti Chattopadhyay's poetry Jete Pari Kintu Keno Jabo into Santali titled Sen Dareyak'an Menkhan Chedak. The book was published in 2016. For this work he was awarded Sahitya Akademi Translation Prize in 2018. In 2020, he received the Sahitya Akademi Award for his collection of poems Gur Dak Kasa Dak.

References

Living people
Indian translators
Recipients of the Sahitya Akademi Award in Santali
Indian civil servants
Vidyasagar University alumni
Santali people
Year of birth missing (living people)
Writers from West Bengal
Recipients of the Sahitya Akademi Prize for Translation